The 2012–13 FC Zürich season is the 107th season in club history.

Review and events

Matches

Legend

Super League

League results and fixtures

League table

Results summary

Swiss Cup

Squad

Squad and statistics

|}

Transfers

In

Out

Coaching staff

Sources

Zurich
FC Zürich seasons